Wanda Wesołowska (born 11 August 1950) is a Polish zoologist known for her work with jumping spiders. She has described more species of jumping spider than any contemporary writer, and is second only to Eugène Simon in the history of arachnology. Originally a student of ornithology, she developed an interest in jumping spiders while still a student at the Siedlce University of Natural Sciences and Humanities in the 1970s. She subsequently undertook study into the genus Heliophanus at the University of Wroclaw. Her subsequent doctoral thesis described 44 new species, and joined the staff at the university. She stayed until retiring in 2020. Her research included the taxonomy and zoogeography of jumping spiders, and has included extensive work on African genera like Menemerus and Pachyballus. She has identified over 500 species, including half of all those from South Africa, as well as having more than 20 named after her.

Early life
Wanda Wesołowska (née Nowysz) was born on 11 August 1950 in Włocławek, Poland. As a young child she lived in Szczecin and, in 1968, she started studying biology at the Faculty of Biology and Earth Sciences in Adam Mickiewicz University in Poznań. Her original interest was ornithology. She achieved her MSc in Biology for her work  (Observations of Wetland Birds on a Dam Reservoir on the Vistula River in Wloclawek during Migration), which was published in Acta Zoologica Cracoviensia in 1973.

Career
After graduating, Wesołowska took a role at what is now the University of Natural Sciences and Humanities (then Wyższa Szkoła Pedagogiczno-Rolnicza) in Siedlce, where she developed her lifelong interest in the jumping spider family (Salticidae). She stayed at Siedlce from 1973 until moving to the University of Wroclaw in 1978 to start her doctoral study. She published her first paper on jumping spiders while at Siedlce, which included descriptions of nine new species, including Euophrys pygmaea and Icius parvus, which were both later moved to the genus Phintella, and  Plexippoides regius.

Wesołowska achieved a doctorate in natural sciences in 1984, with a thesis looking at the genus Heliophanus. In the work, she described 109 species, of which 44 were new. She was awarded a prize by the Ministry of Science and High Education of Poland for her work. She was successively an Assistant, Assistant Professor and Associate Professor at the University. She was awarded Habilitation on the basis of her work A Revision of the Spider Genus Menemerus in Africa (Araneae: Salticidae), published in the Genus, and in 2009 was made a Professor of the institution.

Most of Wesołowska's research covers the taxonomy, characteristics, behaviour and zoogeography of jumping spiders. Much of her work has involved work in Africa. She is author or co-author of half of all South African jumping spider species. She completed revisions of the taxonomy of African species in various jumping spider genera, including Heliophanus, in 1986, Menemerus, in 1999, Mexcala, in 2009, Pochytoides, in 2018, Pachyballus and Peplometus in 2020, and undertook studies of spiders that mimic ants and beetles. She was particularly noted for her collaborations, working with 24 other scientists from countries from Austria to Zimbabwe. She retired in October 2020.

Wesołowska was a member of the African Arachnological Society, the International Society of Arachnology, Polskie Towarzystwo Taksonomiczne and Polskie Towarzystwo Zoologiczne. In 2020, she was awarded the Lawrence Certificate of Merit in 2020 by the African Arachnological Society for her contributions to the study of African spiders.

Taxa described

Wesołowska is the author and co-author of over 120 works. As of January 2023, according to the World Spider Catalog, Wesołowska is responsible for naming 572 species and 40 genera. No other contemporary figure has described more new species and genera of jumping spiders. Only Eugène Simon, who described over 1000 species and 200 genera, has more to his name.

Taxa named in Wesołowska's honour
In recognition of her endeavours in the field, two genera of jumping spiders, Wandawe and Wesolowskana, have been dedicated to Wesołowska.

The following species of jumping spiders have also been named after her:
 Atomosphyrus wandae Bustamante & Ruiz, 2020
 Eburneana wandae Szűts, 2003 
 Heliophanus wesolowskae Rakov & Logunov, 1997
 Marma wesolowskae Salgado & Ruiz, 2020
 Neaetha wesolowskae Żabka & Patoleta, 2020
 Padilla wandae Azarkina & Haddad, 2020
 Pancorius wesolowskae Wang & Wang, 2020
 Parahelpis wandaePatoleta & Żabka, 2020
 Peckhamia wesolowskae Cala-Riquelme, Bustamante, Crews & Cutler, 2020 
 Plexippus wesolowskae Biswas & Raychaudhuri, 1998
 Proszynellus wandae Patoleta & Żabka, 2015
 Pseudicius wesolowskae Zhu & Song, 2001
 Rhenefictus wandae (Wang & Li, 2021)
 Stenaelurillus wandae Logunov, 2020
 Thyenula wesolowskae Zhang & Maddison, 2012
 Zodarion wesolowskae Bosmans & Benhalima, 2020
Some of these, including Stenaelurillus wandae, were specifically named in honour of her 70th birthday.

She has also been honoured in the names other spiders. The list includes the species Cybaeota wesolowskae, two species of ant spiders, Ranops wandae and Zodarion wesolowskae, the crab spider Parabomis wandae, the crevice weaver Sahastata wesolowskae and the long-jawed orb weaver Diphya wesolowskae.

References

Citations

Sources

1950 births
20th-century Polish women scientists
20th-century Polish zoologists
21st-century Polish zoologists
Academic staff of the University of Wrocław
Adam Mickiewicz University in Poznań alumni
Living people
People from Włocławek
Polish arachnologists
University of Wrocław alumni
Women zoologists